Richard Kirwan (7 January 1829 – 2 September 1872) was an English first-class cricketer and clergyman.
 
The son of Captain Richard Kirwan, of the Royal Fusiliers, he was born in France at Boulogne. He was educated at Brighton College, before going up to Emmanuel College, Cambridge. Kirwan made a single appearance in first-class cricket for the Gentlemen of England against a United England Eleven at Hove in 1853. Batting twice in the match, he was dismissed in the Gentlemen of England first-innings for 2 runs by Tom Adams, while in their second-innings he was dismissed without scoring by John Wisden. 

He graduated from Cambridge in 1853 and was ordained in the Church of England in 1855. He was the curate of Little Bardfield in Essex from 1855–57 and Gosfield from 1857–60. He moved to Devon in 1860, where he took up the post of rector of Gittisham until 1872. Kirwan drowned while bathing in the sea off Sidmouth in September 1872. He had married Rose Helen Lampet in 1860, with the couple having at least one son.

References

External links
 

1829 births
1872 deaths
People from Boulogne-sur-Mer
People educated at Brighton College
Alumni of Emmanuel College, Cambridge
English cricketers
Gentlemen of England cricketers
19th-century English Anglican priests
Deaths by drowning in the United Kingdom
Accidental deaths in England
Sportspeople from Pas-de-Calais